Bruno Bruni is the name of:

 Bruno Bruni (artist) (born 1935), Italian artist
 Bruno Bruni (athlete) (born 1955), Italian high jumper
 Bruno Bruni (actor), son of the artist, see The Little Prince (Lost) and This Place Is Death